Ḥazrat-e Said is a village in Badakhshan Province in north-eastern Afghanistan. It is located on the Kokcha River and is on the road to Jurm, about ten miles north of Garghamu.

References

Populated places in Yamgan District